Hoxie House (c. 1675) in Sandwich, Massachusetts is one of the oldest houses on Cape Cod and one of the oldest surviving houses in Massachusetts.

The saltbox house was built in the mid-seventeenth century and occupied around 1675 by Rev. John Smith, his wife Susanna and their 13 children. Smith served as pastor of the Separatist First Church of Sandwich from 1673 until 1689. He also served as a representative to the legislature and recommended tolerance of the Quakers, a religious minority in the area.

In the mid-nineteenth century, Abraham Hoxie, a whaling captain, purchased the property. The town of Sandwich acquired the home in the 1950s and restored the building.

See also
List of the oldest buildings in Massachusetts

References

External links
Article about Hoxie House

Houses completed in 1675
Historic house museums in Massachusetts
Saltbox architecture in Massachusetts
Buildings and structures in Sandwich, Massachusetts
Museums in Barnstable County, Massachusetts
Houses in Barnstable County, Massachusetts
1675 establishments in Massachusetts